Jimmy Sharpe (born October 31, 1939) is a former American football player and coach.  He served as the head football coach at Virginia Polytechnic Institute and State University from 1974 to 1977. He was also an assistant coach at the University of Alabama, under Bear Bryant, and at Mississippi State University.  Sharpe graduated Montgomery's Sidney Lanier High School and, in 1974, from the University of Alabama.

Virginia Tech
Sharpe, an 11-year veteran of Bear Bryant's Alabama coaching staff, was hired by the Hokies in 1974 to replace Charlie Coffey, who had been let go following a lackluster performance.  He was dismissed in 1977 following a disappointing 3–7–1 season.

Head coaching record

References

1939 births
Living people
American football guards
Alabama Crimson Tide football coaches
Alabama Crimson Tide football players
Mississippi State Bulldogs football coaches
Pittsburgh Panthers football coaches
Virginia Tech Hokies football coaches
Sidney Lanier High School alumni
University of Alabama alumni
Sportspeople from Montgomery, Alabama
Players of American football from Montgomery, Alabama